Oliver Sean Plunket (known professionally as Sean Plunket) is a New Zealand broadcast journalist. Plunket has worked for several New Zealand broadcast media companies and stations including Radio Windy, Independent Radio News, Radio New Zealand, TV3, TVNZ, Newstalk ZB, and MagicTalk. Plunket also served as the communications director of The Opportunities Party during the 2017 New Zealand general election. In late 2021, Plunket founded the independent online radio station The Platform, which has marketed itself as promoting free speech, democracy, and debate.

Early life
Plunket was born in Christchurch, the son of journalist Patrick Plunket. He was educated at Plimmerton Primary School and Nelson College from 1980 to 1982, where he was a member of the 1st XV rugby union team in 1981 and 1982. He went on to study at the Wellington Polytechnic School of Journalism.

Broadcasting career

Mainstream media
Plunket's early positions in broadcasting and journalism included a brief stint as a copywriter at Radio Windy, five years at Independent Radio News, a short spell as a reporter for Radio New Zealand, three years as a political reporter on TV3, working as a presenter–reporter on TVNZ's Fair Go  and Under Investigation programmes, and then further roles at TV3 on 20/20 and as senior political reporter.

From 1997 to 2010, he was one of two breakfast hosts of Morning Report between 6 am and 9 am weekdays on Radio New Zealand National. His regular co-host was Geoff Robinson. In 2009, Plunket lost a dispute with his employer, Radio New Zealand, who he took to the Employment Relations Authority. Plunket announced his resignation from Radio New Zealand in June 2010 and his last day on Morning Report was 8 September 2010.

From January 2011 to December 2012 he presented Sean Plunket Mornings on the Wellington branch of Newstalk ZB.

Plunket took over hosting the 9 am–noon weekday slot on Radio Live, later known as MagicTalk, from Michael Laws in April 2013, continuing to December 2015, when he was replaced by Mark Sainsbury. Until 2014, he wrote a weekly column for The Dominion Post.

In January 2015, Plunket made remarks on Radio Live describing New Zealand writer Eleanor Catton as an "ungrateful hua [a Māori slang word]" and a "traitor" for her remarks criticising the National Government's alleged disinterest in the arts and culture, and New Zealand's "tall poppy syndrome." Plunket drew criticism for his remarks from Victoria University Press publisher Fergus Barrowman, TV3 journalist David Farrier, and arts commentator Hamish Keith, who defended Catton's right to freedom of expression and advocacy. The media watchdog Broadcasting Standards Authority received two complaints about Plunket's remarks but rejected them.

During the 2017 New Zealand general election, Plunket served as the director of communications for The Opportunities Party, which was established by economist Gareth Morgan. 

In late September 2017, the Broadcasting Standards Authority appointed Plunket to a three-year term as a member of the media watchdog, commencing 1 October 2017.

Soon after the sacking of former interim MagicTalk talkback radio host John Banks, Plunket left the station in February 2021. Plunket's own talkback radio slot had already been the subject of a successful Broadcasting Standards Authority complaint over remarks that a Māori iwi (tribe) "did not care about child abuse" while discussing an iwi roadblock intended to protect its elderly members from the COVID-19 pandemic. However, Mediaworks has stressed that Plunkett was not pushed to leave as a result.

The Platform, 2021–present

In September 2021, Plunket announced plans to start his own online talkback station called The Platform, which he said would promote free speech, democracy and debate. According to Plunket, the station does not receive funding from public sources such as the Public Interest Journalism Fund due to its requirement for recipients to adhere to the principles of the Treaty of Waitangi, which he regarded as a limitation on free speech. Besides Plunket, other notable hosts have included sports broadcaster Martin Devlin, former Otago Regional Council member Michael Laws, and former ACT Party leader Rodney Hide had joined the talkback station. Notable guests have included politicians such as David Seymour, Winston Peters, Chris Hipkins, and Michael Bassett.

Between 16 and 17 February 2023, the Employment Relations Authority (ERA) heard an employment dispute between Plunket and former Platform digital engagement editor Ani O'Brien, who had previously served as National Party leader Judith Collins' press secretary. O'Brien testified that Plunket had acted aggressively on three occasions between May and June 2022, causing her mental health to deteriorate. While Plunket denied that he had an aggressive demeanour at work, he acknowledged that he had acted "appallingly" in times of "high stress." Plunket also admitted that he lacked experience in managing multiple staff but had since received business and management guidance from company director Wayne Wright. Plunket disputed O'Brien's claims that he had created an unsafe work environment and accused  her of undermining his leadership. During the hearing, Collins' former chief press secretary John Mitchell alleged that O'Brien had undermined Collins' leadership and had significant "trust issues." Both Plunket and O'Brien are expected to make submissions to ERA at a later date, with the Authority expected to make a determination after that.

Legal dispute with David Farrier
In late October 2022, Plunket shared several screenshots on Twitter of a protection order filed against the investigative journalist and filmmaker David Farrier. The dissemination of these Tweets preceded the scheduled release of Farrier's Mister Organ documentary film on 10 November; which looked at the controversial car clamping practices of former Auckland businessman Michael Organ. On 5 November, Farrier confirmed the authenticity of the protection order. On 8 November, Farrier announced he would be pursuing legal action against Plunket disseminating the protection order on Twitter.

Awards
Plunket has been a recipient of Qantas Media Awards in radio and television categories, the New Zealand Radio Awards and the 2001 European Union Journalist Award.

References

Further reading

1964 births
Living people
People from Christchurch
People educated at Nelson College
New Zealand journalists
New Zealand radio journalists
New Zealand television journalists